Albert City is a city in Buena Vista County, Iowa, United States. The population was 677 at the 2020 census.

The town was established in 1890 on property owned by George Anderson, and was initially named Manthorp, after a town in Sweden.  However, the post office department was concerned that the town's name would be confused with the nearby community of Marathon, so Manthorp was renamed for Albertina Anderson, the founder's wife.  Albert City was incorporated in 1900.

The museum in Albert City is located in the former Chicago, Milwaukee and Pacific Railroad-Albert City Station, which is listed on the National Register of Historic Places.

The Albert City Threshermen & Collectors Show has been an annual summer event since 1971.

Geography
Albert City is located at  (42.780912, -94.950569).

Demographics

2010 census
As of the census of 2010, there were 699 people, 297 households, and 174 families living in the city. The racial makeup of the city was 98.0% White, 0.1% African American, 0.1% Asian, 1.0% from other races, and 0.7% from two or more races. Hispanic or Latino of any race were 3.0% of the population.

There were 297 households, of which 26.3% had children under the age of 18 living with them, 48.1% were married couples living together, 6.7% had a female householder with no husband present, 3.7% had a male householder with no wife present, and 41.4% were non-families. 37.4% of all households were made up of individuals, and 18.2% had someone living alone who was 65 years of age or older. The average household size was 2.21 and the average family size was 2.94.

The median age in the city was 46.1 years. 23.9% of residents were under the age of 18; 5% were between the ages of 18 and 24; 20.2% were from 25 to 44; 26.5% were from 45 to 64; and 24.5% were 65 years of age or older. The gender makeup of the city was 48.2% male and 51.8% female.

2000 census
As of the census of 2000, there were 709 people, 284 households, and 191 families living in the city. The racial makeup of the city was 98.73% White, 0.56% Native American, 0.14% Asian, 0.14% from other races, and 0.42% from two or more races. Hispanic or Latino of any race were 0.56% of the population.

There were 284 households, out of which 31.0% had children under the age of 18 living with them, 59.9% were married couples living together, 5.3% had a female householder with no husband present, and 32.7% were non-families. 30.3% of all households were made up of individuals, and 17.3% had someone living alone who was 65 years of age or older. The average household size was 2.38 and the average family size was 2.98.

25.2% are under the age of 18, 6.9% from 18 to 24, 23.4% from 25 to 44, 21.9% from 45 to 64, and 22.6% who were 65 years of age or older. The median age was 41 years. For every 100 females, there were 88.6 males. For every 100 females age 18 and over, there were 83.4 males.

The median income for a household in the city was $33,188, and the median income for a family was $36,167. Males had a median income of $30,987 versus $22,125 for females. The per capita income for the city was $15,219. About 7.9% of families and 9.5% of the population were below the poverty line, including 14.4% of those under age 18 and 10.3% of those age 65 or over.

Education
Albert City is served by the Albert City–Truesdale Community School District.

References

External links

 Albert City via Internet Archive
 Albert City Threshermen & Collectors Show
 Albert City-Truesdale Community School District
 Albert City Public Library

Cities in Buena Vista County, Iowa
Cities in Iowa